Allegheny station may refer to:

Allegheny station (Broad Street Line), a SEPTA station in Philadelphia on the Broad Street Line
Allegheny station (Market–Frankford Line), a SEPTA station in Philadelphia on the Market–Frankford Line
Allegheny station (PAAC), a Pittsburgh Light Rail station
Allegheny station (SEPTA Regional Rail), a SEPTA Regional Rail station in Philadelphia

See also
Allegheny (disambiguation)